Koegathe Rabithome is a Botswana former footballer who played as a midfielder. He played one match for the Botswana national football team in 2005.

See also
Football in Botswana

References

External links

Living people
Association football midfielders
Botswana footballers
Botswana international footballers
Year of birth missing (living people)